Battistina Pizzardo, known as Tina (5 February 1903 Turin – 15 February 1989 Turin), was an Italian mathematician, and an anti-fascist.

Life 
She graduated from the University of Turin in 1925. In 1926, she became a member of the "Academia pro interlingua".

She was in Rome in March 1926 to participate in the qualification competition for teaching in secondary schools. On this occasion he met Altiero Spinelli and other anti-fascists. In July she joined the Communist Party and in October she began teaching mathematics and physics at the Liceo classico Carducci-Ricasoli in Grosseto. Through letters, the police traced her, and arrested her in September for "subversive activity" and sentenced to one year in prison and three years of probation.

She was transferred to the prison in Turin, then to that of Ancona and finally to the women's prison in Rome, where she organized protests with other inmates. She was released from prison on 13 September 1928. She lost her job and was unable to continue teaching in state schools; she had to live precariously giving private mathematics lessons. In Turin she maintained relations with the anti-fascists: her regular friends were Mario Carrara, his wife Paola Lombroso, Giuseppe Levi, Adriano Olivetti, and Barbara Allason. In this period she was attracted by three men: by Altiero Spinelli, Henek Rieser, and by Cesare Pavese.

On 15 May 1935, she was again arrested by the police. The raid involved the editorial staff of the magazine «Cultura» and Pavese, Bruno Maffi, Carlo Levi , Franco Antonicelli and others ended up in prison. Tina was released at the end of June: "in the opinion of the police, a poor teacher who lives in private to the high bourgeoisie and all famous intellectuals." Her marriage to Henek Rieser took place on the following 19 April.

Tina Pizzardo saw Altiero Spinelli again at the fall of fascism. She joined the European Federalist Movement he founded in 1943. She was a candidate for the House in the 1948 general elections and with the Action Party. In 1962, she wrote her memoirs about herself, which were circulated in typescript, and then were published posthumously in 1996, under the title Senza pensarci due volte (Without thinking twice). In her memoirs, Tina Pizzardo herself described herself "as a free and uninhibited woman, full of life and sociability, even fickle, who needed ties with several men at the same time".

Works

References 

1903 births
1989 deaths
20th-century Italian mathematicians
20th-century women mathematicians
Italian mathematicians
Italian women mathematicians
Women mathematicians